Adrián Marcelo Romero (born 20 September 1975) is an Argentine football manager and former player who played as a defender.

Playing career
Born in San Miguel de Tucumán, Romero played in Bolivia, Ecuador and Colombia aside from his home country. He notably represented All Boys in his home country, and The Strongest (three spells), Independiente Petrolero and La Paz FC in Bolivia. He retired in 2008 with Chacarita Juniors.

Managerial career
After retiring, Romero worked as a youth manager and was also an assistant of Pedro Monzón on several occasions. On 22 August 2018, he returned to Bolivia after being named manager of Universitario de Sucre in the Copa Simón Bolívar.

On 31 October 2020, Romero was appointed Deportivo FATIC manager. On 3 May 2022, he returned to Universitario de Sucre, with the club now in the Primera División.

On 25 July 2022, after just one win in nine matches, Romero left Universitario on a mutual agreement.

References

External links

1975 births
Living people
Sportspeople from San Miguel de Tucumán
Argentine footballers
Association football defenders
The Strongest players
All Boys footballers
C.S. Emelec footballers
Deportivo Pereira footballers
La Paz F.C. players
Atlético Tucumán footballers
Chacarita Juniors footballers
Argentine expatriate footballers
Expatriate footballers in Bolivia
Expatriate footballers in Ecuador
Expatriate footballers in Colombia
Argentine expatriate sportspeople in Bolivia
Argentine expatriate sportspeople in Ecuador
Argentine expatriate sportspeople in Colombia
Argentine football managers
Argentine expatriate football managers
Expatriate football managers in Bolivia
Universitario de Sucre managers